Alexander Pohlmann (10 September 1865 – 5 October 1952) was a liberal German politician, mayor of Kattowitz (Katowice, Poland) and member of the Weimar National Assembly and the Weimar German parliament

Pohlmann was born in Graudenz, West Prussia,  (Grudziądz, Poland), his father was the mayor of Graudenz.  He studied law and administrative sciences in Freiburg, Leipzig and Berlin and started to work at the municipal administration of Frankfurt (Main) in 1896 and Posen (Poznań) in 1899.

Pohlmann became the Lord Mayor of Kattowitz in 1903, a position he held until January 1920. He became a member of the Fortschrittliche Volkspartei and was elected as a member of the regional parliament of the Province of Silesia in 1904 (or 1909) and member of the Prussian House of Representatives in 1915.

After World War I he became a member of the German Democratic Party and was elected a member of the Weimar National Assembly in 1919 and the German Reichstag from 1920 to 1922. He served as the President of the Regierungsbezirk Magdeburg from 1920 to 1930. Pohlmann died in Freiburg in 1952.

Notes

References

1865 births
1952 deaths
People from Grudziądz
People from West Prussia
Progressive People's Party (Germany) politicians
German Democratic Party politicians
University of Freiburg alumni
Humboldt University of Berlin alumni
Leipzig University alumni
Members of the Weimar National Assembly
Members of the Reichstag of the Weimar Republic